Tanak Tepong is a settlement near Mataram, on the island of Lombok, in Indonesia.

References

Populated places in Lombok